Hartford is a village and civil parish in the unitary authority of Cheshire West and Chester and the ceremonial county of Cheshire, England. It forms part of the Weaver Vale parliamentary constituency. According to the 2011 Census, the population of the parish was 5,558.

Hartford is situated in the Cheshire Plain to the south west of the town of Northwich, and is surrounded by the parishes of Weaverham to the north, Kingsmead and Davenham to the east, Whitegate and Marton to the south and Cuddington to the west.

History
Hartford was recorded in the Domesday Book of 1086, when the Manor was held by Gilbert de Venables as part of the Barony of Kinderton. Prior to the reign of Edward III it was held by a family who assumed the local name, from which it passed to the Horton, Massey, Holcroft, Marbury and Davies families.

In 1644 during the English Civil War a battle was fought at Hartford Green when Royalists from Chester encountered the Parliamentary forces from Northwich.

St John the Baptist Church was built in 1875, on the site of an earlier church consecrated in 1824. The original building was replaced because the village's population grew and the church became too small. The new building was designed by John Douglas.

Hartford was formerly a township divided between two ancient parishes, with the greater part belonging to Witton chapelry of Great Budworth ancient parish, and a much smaller part in Weaverham cum Milton ancient parish. It also formed part of Eddisbury Hundred, and in 1836 was placed in Northwich poor law union. It was constituted a civil parish in 1866, and in 1875 was added to the newly formed Northwich rural sanitary district.

Hartford railway station opened in 1837. A war memorial to those from the village who fought in World War I was erected in 1921 and stands in the centre of a path in the churchyard of St John's Church.

From 1894 to 1974 the whole of Hartford was part of Northwich rural district, and it was served by Vale Royal borough council. In April 2009 the latter ceased to exist, and Hartford is now a civil parish within the unitary authority of Cheshire West and Chester.

Landmarks

Hartford has a number of Grade II listed buildings including Hartford Hall Hotel which dates from the 16th century and Vale Royal Railway Viaduct, built in 1837.

St John the Baptist Church holds Evangelical services. Hartford also has a Methodist Church.

Hartford has a number of local shops across two shopping parades, including a newsagents, hairdressers, dry cleaners, a florist, a cafe, a butcher. The village is also home to a number of pubs.

The village is home to Hartford Tennis Club, Hartford Cricket Club, a bowling club, and a golf course with a driving range.

A Theatre owned by the independent school, The Grange, is located at their Senior school off Bradburns Lane.

Education

Hartford is an educational hub with roughly the same number of students attending the numerous schools in the village as inhabitants.

Hartford is home to several schools including St. Nicholas Catholic High School, Hartford High School, a specialist sports and languages school, Hartford Primary School (locally known as "Riddings Lane"), St. Wilfrid's Catholic Primary School and Hartford Manor Community Primary School. There are two schools which cater for children with learning disabilities called Cloughwood and Greenbank. The private Grange School is also located in Hartford.

Transport

Hartford is bisected by the A559, known as Chester Road. The A556 road bypasses the village as part of the Northwich bypass. The bridge that carries the road over the River Weaver is known as Hartford Bridge or Blue Bridge, and was built in 1938. The A556 "Hartford Picnic Area' is shortly after the Blue Bridge on Westbound A556, this is home to a cafe & is also a well known dogging spot. 

Hartford is served by Hartford railway station on the West Coast Main Line between Liverpool and Crewe and by Greenbank railway station on the Mid-Cheshire Line between Chester and Manchester Piccadilly.

Notable people from Hartford
 Clarence "Lal" Hilditch, footballer
 Tim Lamb, cricketer
 Adolphus Rooke, politician in colonial Tasmania
 Ann Todd, actress

See also

Listed buildings in Hartford, Cheshire
Hartford Manor

Notes and references

Notes

Bibliography

External links

 St. John's Church
 Hartford Parish Council
 Hartford Parish Boundary

Villages in Cheshire
Civil parishes in Cheshire